Joseph P. Riley Jr. Park is a baseball stadium located in Charleston, South Carolina. The stadium is named after Charleston's longest-serving mayor, Joseph P. Riley Jr., who was instrumental in its construction.  The stadium replaced College Park.  It was built in 1997 and seats 6,000 people.

Nicknamed "The Joe" by locals, Joseph P. Riley Jr. Park is primarily used for baseball and is the home field of the Charleston RiverDogs baseball team of the Carolina League and The Citadel Bulldogs baseball team, whose campus is located nearby.

History
The park has hosted 15 Southern Conference baseball tournaments through the 2014 season.  On March 2, 2012, the venue hosted the neutral-site game of the Clemson–South Carolina baseball series.  The game, which South Carolina won 3–2 in 11 innings, was attended by 5,851 spectators.  The Citadel defeated the Gamecocks 10–8 on April 16, 2014 before 6,500 fans, setting a new record for a college baseball crowd in Charleston.

The Citadel holds lifetime playing rights at the ballpark and has its own clubhouse in the stadium.  The land that the stadium is built on once belonged to the school, and was a part of the land-swap negotiations that resulted in the City of Charleston taking over the land and giving The Citadel title to College Park.

See also
 List of NCAA Division I baseball venues

References

External links
Official Website
Joseph P. Riley Jr. Park | Charleston RiverDogs The Joe
Joseph P. Riley Jr. Park Views – Ball Parks of the Minor Leagues

The Citadel Bulldogs baseball venues
Sports venues in Charleston, South Carolina
Minor league baseball venues
Baseball venues in South Carolina
Sports venues completed in 1997
1997 establishments in South Carolina
Populous (company) buildings
Carolina League ballparks